Seojeongni Station is a station in Seojeong-dong, Pyeongtaek, South Korea. Mugunghwa-ho trains running on the Gyeongbu Line stop here.  Additionally, services on Seoul Subway Line 1 have been calling at this station since 2005.  Its station subname is Kookje College (An international college).

History
It is the name of a station on Line 1 of the National Railways located at 427-1 Seojeong-dong, Pyeongtaek-si. There are three good wells called Seodunmul nearby, so it was called Seojeongni, and as the National Railway Line 1 was extended to Cheonan, the station got its name.
Seojeongni Station opened with the Gyeongbu Line in 1905 to service the agricultural area between Pyeongtaek and Osan. It featured Bidulgi (4th class) and limited Tongil (3rd class) services. These were eventually phased out in favor of limited Mugunghwa (then 2nd class) services in the 1990s and 2000s (decade).  On January 20, 2005, Seoul Subway Line 1 started local and express services and in 2010 the new Nuriro class of commuter trains began service to Seoul Station, Yongsan, Anyang, Suwon, Osan, Pyeongtaek and Cheonan.

This station has been in operation since the opening of the Gyeongbu Line. Surprisingly, Songtan Station was built during the Korean War, so there is a big difference between the opening period of more than 50 years. In other words, Songtan Station was built during the Korean War and had a strong military character, and Seojeong-ri Station originally served as the center of Songtan-myeon. Prior to the arrival of the metropolitan train, Pigeon, Tongil, and Mugunghwa stopped. It is one of the two stations in the old Songtan-si area, and it was bigger than Songtan Station from the past. It has been there since the opening of the Gyeongbu Line (1905), and at Songtan Station, only some trains stopped, but this station was a mandatory stop for the trains. Even now, this relationship is still there, and some trains of the Mugunghwa train stop and all the express trains stop during rush hour. When Songtan-eup, Pyeongtaek-gun, was promoted to Songtan-si in 1981, Seojeong 'ni' became Seojeong 'dong', but the station name still remains as Seojeong 'ni'. The station name is Kukje University, and although there is an international university nearby, it is 4 km long. Chongshin University - farther than Isu Station. However, the school itself operates school buses, and there are also village bus routes. Unlike Sinchang Station, there is only one university near the station, so I thought it would be okay, but in fact, Korea Welfare University is located in the same Jangan-dong nearby, but Korea Welfare University is designated as a substation of PyeongtaekJije Station. It is difficult to get to from PyeongtaekJije Station, so it is much more convenient to take the bus from Pyeongtaek Station or this station. Passengers using the Mugunghwa also have to go through the train ticket gates, so the emergency ticket gates are open for passengers using the Mugunghwa. There are people who take advantage of this to get on the train free of charge by going through the Mugunghwa passenger emergency ticket gate and going to the train platform. The Pyeongtaek high-speed connection line from this station to PyeongtaekJije Station on the Suseo-Pyeongtaek high-speed line is under construction. After the opening, KTX via Suwon will be able to go directly to Cheonan-Asan Station.

Information around the station 
Godeok International New Town is under construction in the southwest.
If you look at exit 2 and 3 information, Pyeongtaek/Dangjin Port, Seohaedaegyo Bridge, and Cheongbuk-eup are indicated, but the directions are the same, but they are quite far away. Cheongbuk-eup takes at least 20 minutes by car and is farther than Osan Station, It takes at least 40 minutes to get to Pyeongtaek Port. That distance is equivalent to the distance between Suwon Station from here. However, as of 2020, Godeokgalpyeong-ro was built and a bus lane was built, so the wasteland can no longer be seen, and you can see the appearance of a new city.
In the direction of Exit 1, there is Seojeongni 5-day Market (Seojeongni Market) and the city area is spread out. If you go further straight ahead, you will see Songtan City Center and National Road No. 1 centered on the Songtan Branch Office (formerly Songtan City Hall).

History of change
 January 1, 1905: Started business
 December 31, 1932 : Construction of the new station was completed.
 September 10, 1971: Designated as an anthracite cargo arrival station
 January 1, 1994: Stopped handling of small packages
 June 1, 2001: Suspension of ticket sales for specific Tongil trains and computerization of all trains operating on Gyeongbu and Janghang lines
 January 1, 2004: New station completed
 January 20, 2005: Seoul Metropolitan Subway Line 1 opened
 June 1, 2009: Nuriro train service started
 December 30, 2010: Stop handling cargo
 December 30, 2019: Suspension of Nuriro again between Seoul and Sinchang
 January 13, 2020: Restart of Nuriro service (Seoul-Sinchang)
 May 23, 2020: Suspension of Nuriro (Seoul-Sinchang)

Recent changes

Seojeongni Station has an average daily number of over 10,000 users as the number of users continues to increase due to development projects such as Seojeong-dong and Jungang-dong, as well as development projects such as Godeok International New Town and Godeok Industrial Complex. There was a long-standing inconvenience in using the railroad. Accordingly, the city signed a business agreement with the National Railroad Corporation and Gyeonggi Housing and Urban Corporation to provide a convenient railroad environment for citizens using Seojeongni Station and to resolve the imbalance of convenience facilities in the original downtown, and install escalators at the main entrance to the original downtown and in the passageway connecting the subway platform. promoted
As a result, in November 2021, the escalator was installed in the passageway connecting the upper and lower train platforms and is in operation.

Vicinity
Kookje College is nearby.  On June 4, 2009, a Homeplus store opened just a few blocks from the subway station. This area was designated by the city council as a development area.  Its neighborhood is also part of a Pyeongtaek construction zone, which also includes Seojeong-dong, Jangdang-dong, Mogok-dong, Ichung-dong, and Jije-dong.  Located near the station are many shops and vendors.  Official plans for a "new city" have been announced.

Passengers

References

Seoul Metropolitan Subway stations
Railway stations in Gyeonggi Province
Railway stations in Korea opened in 1905
Metro stations in Pyeongtaek